Kizhany is a rural locality (a village) in Vtorovskoye Rural Settlement, Kameshkovsky District, Vladimir Oblast, Russia. The population was 15 as of 2010.

Geography 
Kizhany is located 13 km south of Kameshkovo (the district's administrative centre) by road. Mostsy is the nearest rural locality.

References 

Rural localities in Kameshkovsky District